Phrynobatrachus albomarginatus is a species of frog in the family Phrynobatrachidae.
It is endemic to Democratic Republic of the Congo.
Its natural habitats are subtropical or tropical moist lowland forest, swampland, and intermittent freshwater marshes.

References

albomarginatus
Endemic fauna of the Democratic Republic of the Congo
Amphibians described in 1933
Taxonomy articles created by Polbot
Northern Congolian forest–savanna mosaic